Stella Artois is a pilsner beer, first brewed in 1926 by Brouwerij Artois in Leuven, Belgium. In its original form, the beer is 5.2 per cent ABV, the country's standard for pilsners. The beer is also sold in other countries like the UK, Ireland, Canada and Australia, where it has a reduced ABV. Stella Artois is owned by Interbrew International B.V. which is a subsidiary of the world's largest brewer, Anheuser-Busch InBev SA/NV.

History
The Den Hoorn brewery in Leuven opened in 1366, when it was a tavern brewing its own beer for sale under the sign of a hunting horn. In 1708, Sébastien Artois became head brewer; then, in 1717, purchased the brewery, renaming it Brouwerij Artois.

In 1926, Brouwerij Artois launched Stella as a Christmas beer, named after the Christmas star. First sold in the winter season, it eventually became available year-round, with exports into the broad European market commencing in 1930. Production was halted for a period when operations were suspended during World War II. By 1960, about 100 million gallons of Stella Artois were being produced annually. Whitbread began to brew it under contract in the United Kingdom in 1976.

In 1988, Brouwerij Artois was a founding member in the merger creating Interbrew. That year, Taylorbrands founder David Taylor created a new package design, bottle design, and shape. The original 1926 bottle label inspired the design, which replaced a 1960s design. The design incorporates the horn symbol and the 1366 date of the original Den Hoorn brewery. The label also shows medals for excellence awarded to Brouwerij Artois at a number of trade exhibitions in Belgium in the 19th and 20th centuries. The name Stella Artois is held within a cartouche which was influenced by the style of Belgian architecture in Leuven.

In 1993, Interbrew moved production of Stella Artois into a new, fully automated brewery in Leuven. In 2004, Interbrew was part of the merger creating InBev, and by 2006, total annual production volume of Stella Artois exceeded one billion litres.

In 2008, InBev was part of the merger creating the Anheuser-Busch InBev (AB InBev) brewery company.  That same year, a lower-alcohol version, Stella Artois 4%, was introduced in the UK market. In 2011, a cider, Stella Artois Cidre, was launched.

In 2020, AB InBev reduced the alcohol content of their beers for the UK market, from 4.8% to 4.6%. The original UK strength of Stella Artois was 5.2% and 4.8% from 2008 until 2020. According to Freddy Delvaux, former head of the in-house laboratory, the Belgian version was 33 IBU when he joined the lab in 1973, compared to just 20 IBU in 2014.

Production

Stella Artois is brewed in Belgium (in the plants at Leuven and Jupille) and the United Kingdom, as well as in other countries. Much of the beer exported from Europe is produced at InBev's brewery in Belgium, and packaged in the Beck's Brewery in Bremen, Germany. Stella Artois is also brewed for the Australian market by Lion. In the United States, Stella Artois is imported and distributed by Anheuser-Busch. For the Hungarian market, Stella Artois is brewed in Bőcs, Hungary, by Borsod Brewery, under licence from InBev. For the Canadian market is brewed by Labatt Brewery in Ontario, Canada.

Stella Artois is available on draught and in several packaged sizes.

Advertising

United Kingdom
Initially, brewers Whitbread launched Stella in the UK with advertisements featuring the slogan "Stella's for the fellas who take their lager strong". The images showed a Stella-monogrammed half-pint glass (due to its strength) – in one advertisement with a muscular 'glass arm' for a handle, in the other a glass sitting beside a torn-in-half telephone directory. This was the same creative unit which was involved, at the time, in Whitbread's launch of Trophy Bitter "The pint that thinks it's a quart".

In the 1980s and 1990s, the Stella Artois advertising slogan in the United Kingdom was "Reassuringly Expensive". The UK television advertising campaigns became known for their distinctive style of imitating European cinema and their leitmotiv inspired by Giuseppe Verdi's La forza del destino. The campaigns began with a series of advertisements based on the 1986 French film Jean de Florette, directed by the British duo Anthea Benton and Vaughan Arnell, moving on to other genres, including war films, silent comedy and surrealism. They have used notable film directors such as Jonathan Glazer. Furthermore, the brand makes extensive use of the French language in its advertising campaigns, even though the beer brand originates from the monolingual Dutch-speaking city of Leuven. An example of this can be seen in the advertising campaign for Stella Artois Cidre, in which the tag-line "C'est cidre, not cider" is used, although this cider is produced in Zonhoven, which also lies in the Dutch-speaking Flemish Region.

Stella Artois is advertised as containing "only 4 ingredients: hops, malted barley, maize and water".  Yeast is also an ingredient used in the fermentation process, but almost all of it is removed before packaging. Since 2009, Stella Artois has been suitable for vegans, as isinglass (fish bladder) is no longer used to remove trace amounts of yeast.

Brand image
At least since the early 21st century, Stella Artois has carried the nickname of the "wife beater" in the United Kingdom, due to a perceived connection between binge drinking involving the brand and domestic violence against women. In January 2012, the online activities of AB InBev lobbyists, Portland Communications, were exposed in the United Kingdom when Tom Watson, a member of the Labour opposition party said that the company (then owned by Tim Allan, a former advisor to ex-Prime Minister Tony Blair) was trying to remove references to Stella Artois from the "wife beater" disambiguation page and the phrase "wife beater" from the article on Stella Artois in the English Wikipedia.

Marketing
Stella Artois has been associated with film in the UK since 1994, organising events, sponsoring television, and hosting a website. Stella Artois has been or is a primary sponsor of the Cannes, Melbourne, and Sundance film festivals, the Independent Spirit Awards, the Dallas International Film Festival, and the Little Rock Film Festival.

Stella Artois has broadcast several Super Bowl ads, as part of Anheuser–Busch InBev's overall ad buys during the game. The brand made its debut during Super Bowl XLV in 2011, in an ad starring Adrien Brody. The commercial was heavily criticised in the Belgian media for giving the impression that the beer is French.

See also

 Artois Bock
 Beer and breweries by region
 Peeterman Artois

References

External links

Studio Artois: official film website
Brasserie Artois: Artois Family of Beers
Rating on RateBeer.com

Belgian beer brands
Belgian brands
InBev brands